Charles Joseph Ignace Marie Welter (6 April 1880 – 28 March 1972) was a Dutch politician and diplomat of the defunct General League of Roman Catholic Caucuses (ABRK) party later the Roman Catholic State Party (RKSP), the Catholic People's Party (KVP) and founder of Catholic National Party (KNP) before rejoining the Catholic People's Party now merged into the Christian Democratic Appeal (CDA) party and nonprofit director.

Welter worked as a civil servant for the Ministry of the Interior from July 1901 until October 1902 and for the Ministry of Colonial Affairs in the Kedu Residency and Pekalongan in the Dutch East Indies from October 1902 until April 1908 and in Batavia from April 1908 until May 1911. Welter moved back to the Netherlands and worked for the Ministry of Colonial Affairs in The Hague from May 1911 until November 1915 and returned to the Dutch East Indies working for the Ministry of Colonial Affairs in Batavia from  November 1915 until October 1925. After the election of 1925 Welter was appointed as Minister of Colonial Affairs in the Cabinet Colijn I, taking office on 1 October 1925. The Cabinet Colijn I fell just 3 months laste on 11 November 1925 and continued to serve in a demissionary capacity until the cabinet formation of 1926 with Welters not giving a cabinet post in the new cabinet, the Cabinet Colijn I was replaced by the Cabinet De Geer I on 8 March 1926. In March 1926 Welters was nominated as a member of the Council of the Indies, serving from 30 March 1926 until 30 March 1931. Welter semi-retired from active politic and became active in the public sector served on several state commissions and councils on behalf of the government (Cadastre Agency, Statistics Netherlands and the Welter Commission) and as an diplomat and lobbyist for several economic delegations on behalf of the government. Welter was elected as a Member of the House of Representatives after the election of 1937, taking office on 8 June 1937. Following the cabinet formation of 1937 Welter was appointed again as Minister of Colonial Affairs in the Cabinet Colijn IV, taking office on 24 June 1937. The Cabinet Colijn IV fell on 29 June 1939 and continued to serve in a demissionary capacity until the first cabinet formation of 1939 with Welters not giving a cabinet post in the new cabinet, the Cabinet Colijn IV was replaced by the Cabinet Colijn V on 25 July 1939. On 25 July 1939 just three days later Cabinet Colijn V was dismissed by Queen Wilhelmina and continued to serve in a demissionary capacity until the second cabinet formation of 1939 when it was replaced by the Cabinet De Geer II with Welter again appointed as Minister of Colonial Affairs, taking office on 10 August 1939.

On 10 May 1940 Nazi Germany invaded the Netherlands and the government fled to London to escape the German occupation. The Cabinet De Geer II fell on 26 August 1940 after a conflict between Queen Wilhelmina and Prime Minister Dirk Jan de Geer and continued to serve in a demissionary capacity until the cabinet formation of 1940 when it was replaced by the Cabinet Gerbrandy I with Welter continuing as Minister of Colonial Affairs and was appointed as Minister of Finance dual serving in both positions, taking office on 3 September 1940. The Cabinet Gerbrandy I fell on 12 June 1941 after a conflict between Queen Wilhelmina and Minister of Defence Adriaan Dijxhoorn and continued to serve in a demissionary capacity until the cabinet formation of 1941 when it was replaced by the Cabinet Gerbrandy II with Welter continuing as of Minister of Colonial Affairs, taking office on 27 July 1941. On 17 November 1941 Welter and Minister of Finance and Minister of Commerce, Industry and Shipping Max Steenberghe resigned after disagreeing with the cabinets war policies.

Returning to the Netherlands in 1945, Welter was appointed member of the Senate for the Catholic People's Party. In March 1946 he was a member of the parliamentary committee of inquiry into the policy of the Dutch East Indies government. He disagreed strongly with the government policy on the Dutch Indies; as well as his party's cooperation with the Labor Party. 

From the beginning of 1947, the Provisional Catholic Committee of Action acted within the KVP against the Indonesian policy of the 'Roman-Red coalition'. In 1948, this committee took part in the parliamentary elections with a separate Welter list, winning a single seat.  On 11 December 1948 the Catholic National Party was established. Welter, who occupied the only seat in parliament, also became the first general chairman of the KNP. 

After the transfer of sovereignty to Indonesia, this KNP initially seemed to still have a reason to exist, especially as a right-wing opposition party, not only with regard to the lasting problems in relations with Indonesia, which had become independent, but also in opposition to the trade union influence within the Catholic People's Party. In 1952, the KNP achieved 2.7% of the vote and 2 seats. In October 29 1955 under pressure from the bishops the KNP merged back into the Catholic People's Party. When the Drees cabinet fell at the end of 1958, Welter's last complaint against the KVP also disappeared, because years of cooperation with the socialists came to an end. 

Welter remained as a Member of Parliament for the KVP from 1956 to 1963.

Decorations

References

External links

Official
  Ch.J.I.M. (Charles) Welter Parlement & Politiek
  Ch.J.I.M. Welter (KVP) Eerste Kamer der Staten-Generaal

|-
 

 

1880 births
1972 deaths
Catholic National Party politicians
Catholic People's Party politicians
Delft University of Technology alumni
Dutch critics
Dutch expatriates in England
Dutch expatriates in Indonesia
Dutch lobbyists
Dutch nonprofit directors
Dutch people of World War II
Dutch political party founders
Dutch traditionalist Catholics
Dutch Roman Catholics
General League of Roman Catholic Caucuses politicians
Grand Officers of the Order of Orange-Nassau
Knights of the Order of the Netherlands Lion
Leaders of political parties in the Netherlands
Members of the House of Representatives (Netherlands)
Members of the Senate (Netherlands)
Ministers of Colonial Affairs of the Netherlands
Ministers of Finance of the Netherlands
Party chairs of the Netherlands
Politicians from The Hague
Roman Catholic State Party politicians
20th-century Dutch civil servants
20th-century Dutch diplomats
20th-century Dutch politicians